Richard Rodrigo Calderón Llori (born June 25, 1993, in Lago Agrio, Ecuador) is an Ecuadorian professional footballer who plays as midfielder.

Playing for LDU, he made his professional debut on 16 October 2011, starting in a 3–0 home win against Liga de Loja, and scored his first goal on 27 November 2011, in a 1–2 home loss against Imbabura.

Playing for Barcelona, Calderón made his Copa Libertadores debut on 20 April 2017, starting in a 1–1 home drawn against Botafogo. He played another Copa Libertadores matches against traditional South American teams, like Estudiantes de La Plata, Atlético Nacional, Olimpia and Santos.

Career statistics

References

External links
 

1993 births
Living people
Ecuadorian footballers
Association football midfielders
L.D.U. Quito footballers
C.D. ESPOLI footballers
S.D. Quito footballers
Barcelona S.C. footballers
C.D. Universidad Católica del Ecuador footballers
Delfín S.C. footballers